Gerald Okamura (born 1940) is an American martial artist and stuntman.

Career 
Okamura began his martial arts with judo in 1953. He has practiced kendo, aikido, taekwondo, and he is currently a 5th degree black belt in Kung Fu San Soo (his sensei was Jimmy H. Woo). Okamura is also a designer of various types of weaponry.

Okamura began doing stunts in 1975, getting his first credited role in 1980. Since then he has appeared in 39 feature films, notably Big Trouble in Little China, Samurai Cop, Samurai Cop 2: Deadly Vengeance, Ninja Academy, 9½ Ninjas!, Ring of Fire, Blade, and G.I. Joe: The Rise of Cobra. Other roles he's played are Kai-Ogi in Mighty Morphin Alien Rangers, a sensei in Power Rangers Wild Force, and Chao Chong in VR Troopers.

Filmography

Film

Television

Video games

References

External links 

1940 births
Living people
American aikidoka
American male judoka
American kendoka
American male film actors
American people of Japanese descent
American stunt performers
American male taekwondo practitioners
People from Hilo, Hawaii
Male actors from Hawaii
20th-century American people